Douglas Smythe is an American visual effects artist. He won an Academy Award in the category Best Visual Effects for the film Death Becomes Her.

Selected filmography 
 Death Becomes Her (1991; co-won with Ken Ralston, Doug Chiang and Tom Woodruff Jr.)

References

External links 

Living people
Place of birth missing (living people)
Year of birth missing (living people)
Visual effects artists
Visual effects supervisors
Best Visual Effects Academy Award winners